Vincent Richard Hogg (born 3 July 1952 in Salisbury - now Harare) is a former Zimbabwean cricketer. He played two ODIs for Zimbabwe in the 1983 Cricket World Cup.

Hogg holds the record for the slowest innings in first-class cricket history - 0 runs in 87 minutes, for Zimbabwe-Rhodesia B against Natal B at Pietermaritzburg in 1979–80.

References

External links

1952 births
Living people
Cricketers from Harare
White Zimbabwean sportspeople
Rhodesia cricketers
Zimbabwe One Day International cricketers
Zimbabwean cricketers
Zimbabwean cricket administrators
Cricketers at the 1983 Cricket World Cup